The Toyota Sports Center (formerly the HealthSouth Training Center) is a practice facility for the Los Angeles Kings, and the Ontario Reign, located on 555 North Nash Street in El Segundo, California. The $24 million,  facility broke ground on April 28, 1999, and officially opened on March 5, 2000.

The facility is located on the grounds of the Grand Avenue Corporate Center. The facility includes three public ice rinks, NHL size, Olympic size, and a smaller size ice rink (the smaller-sized rink was originally an inline and roller skating rink, and was turned into an ice rink, completed in September 2011), sports medicine (formerly the basketball court), and a restaurant. In addition, the property houses complete training facilities, including locker rooms and office space for the Kings and Lakers. The facility's three public ice rinks hosts several amateur and youth hockey leagues throughout the year. One million guests pass through the doors of the facility annually.

It is also an important training center for elite figure skaters, with Frank Carroll as head coach.  Skaters who have trained at this rink include Michelle Kwan, Timothy Goebel, Evan Lysacek, Beatrisa Liang, Gracie Gold, and Mirai Nagasu.

The facility can be accessed by the Metro Green Line near the El Segundo Station and the Mariposa Station.

The Toyota Sports Performance Center is home to the Los Angeles Jr. Kings Hockey Program. The Jr. Kings program has seen tremendous growth since their move to the Toyota Sports Performance Center upon its opening. Due to the program's increasing number of teams, they now play some home games at The Rinks-Lakewood ICE, in Lakewood, California, as well.

The Toyota Sports Center is owned by AEG and operated by American Skating Entertainment Centers.  The NBA Development League's Los Angeles D-Fenders played their home games here from the 2011–12 to 2016–17 seasons.

Beginning in the 2017–18 season, Lakers practices relocated to the UCLA Health Training Center, located two blocks away. The D-Fenders also switched to the new arena and were re-branded as the South Bay Lakers.

With the relocation of the Lakers, the Ontario Reign has moved their practices to the Toyota Sports Center in 2019, effectively making the facility a fully operational Los Angeles Kings facility.

The facility was designed by architect Jon Drezner.

See also
 List of sports venues with the name Toyota

References

External links
Toyota Sports Center
AEG Worldwide-Toyota Sports Center
American Skating Centers, LLC

Sports venues in Los Angeles County, California
Los Angeles Kings
Los Angeles Sparks
El Segundo, California
Indoor ice hockey venues in the United States
Sports venues completed in 1999
1999 establishments in California
National Hockey League practice facilities
Basketball venues in California